I've Got News for You may refer to:

"I've Got News for You" (Feargal Sharkey song), a song by Feargal Sharkey
"I've Got News for You", a song written by Roy Alfred and performed by Ray Charles on his album Genius + Soul = Jazz